This is a list of  lighthouses in Aruba.

Lighthouses

See also
 Lists of lighthouses and lightvessels

References

External links

 

Aruba
Lighthouses